Martin J. Siegert  is a British glaciologist, a professor at Imperial College London, and co-director of the Grantham Institute - Climate Change and Environment.

Born in Walthamstow in East London, Siegert was a pupil at Sudbury Upper Comprehensive School in Suffolk in the early 1980s. He earned a bachelor's degree in Geological Geophysics in 1989 from Reading University, and a PhD in the numerical modelling of large ice sheets from Cambridge University in 1994.

Siegert's work involves the study of large ice sheets in the past, at present and in future, using combinations of numerical modelling, satellite observations and glacier geophysical measurements.

In 1996, he was part of the Russian-UK team that published an article in Nature revealing subglacial Lake Vostok in East Antarctica to be over 500 m deep. In the same year he published an inventory of Antarctic subglacial lakes that included Lake Ellsworth.

He is the UK PI of the US-UK-China-Australia ICECAP programme, that uses long-range airborne geophysics to measure and characterise the ice sheet and lithosphere in previously unexplored regions of Antarctica, including Totten Glacier and the Aurora Subglacial Basin, Byrd Glacier and the Wilkes Subglacial Basin, and Princess Elizabeth Land.

He was the PI of a NERC-funded airborne geophysics campaign to the Weddell Sea sector of West Antarctica (2009-2013), which showed the grounding line of Institute Ice Stream to be perched on a steep reverse sloping bed.

In December 2012 he led a NERC-funded attempt to sample Lake Ellsworth using a purpose built clean hot-water drill and water-sampling/measuring probe. The expedition was halted when the drill experienced technical problems preventing drilling to the lake surface.

In 2002, Siegert was awarded a Philip Leverhulme Prize by the Leverhulme Trust.

In 2007, Siegert was elected as a Fellow of the Royal Society of Edinburgh.

In 2013, Siegert was awarded the Martha T. Muse Prize for excellence in Antarctic science and policy.

Selected publications

Books

Siegert, M.J. Ice sheets and Late Quaternary environmental change. John Wiley, Chichester, UK, 231pp. (2001).

Florindo, F. and Siegert, M.J. (eds.). Antarctic Climate Evolution. Developments in Earth & Environmental Science, vol. 8. Elsevier, Amsterdam, the Netherlands. 606pp.  (2008).

Siegert, M.J., Kennicutt, M, Bindschadler, R. (eds.). Antarctic Subglacial Aquatic Environments. AGU Geophysical Monograph 192, 246pp. (2011).

Siegert, M.J. and Bradwell, T. (eds). Antarctic Earth Sciences. Transactions of the Royal Society of Edinburgh, 104, 1, 80pp. (2013).

Siegert, M.J., Priscu, J. Alekhina, I., Wadham, J. and Lyons, B. (eds.). Antarctic Subglacial Lake Exploration: first results and future plans. Transactions of the Royal Society of London, A. 374, issue 2059. (2016).

Siegert, M.J., Jamieson, S.S.R. and White, D.A. (eds.). Exploration of Subsurface Antarctica: uncovering past changes and modern processes. Geological Society of London, Special Publication, 461, 255pp. (2018).

Nuttall, M., Christensen, T. and Siegert, M.J. (eds.). Routledge Handbook of the Polar Regions. Routledge, 556pp. (2018).

Florindo, F., Siegert, M.J., De Santis, L. and Naish, T. (eds.). Antarctic Climate Evolution. Second Edition. Elsevier. 804pp.  (2021).

References

Living people
Academics of Imperial College London
Fellows of the Royal Society of Edinburgh
Alumni of the University of Reading
Alumni of the University of Cambridge
Year of birth missing (living people)